State Trunk Highway 143 (often called Highway 143, STH-143 or WIS 143) was a  state highway in Washington and Ozaukee counties in Wisconsin, United States, that ran east–west between south of West Bend and Cedarburg.

History
Initially, in 1923, WIS 143 ran along Washington Avenue from WIS 57 (now Columbia Road) in Cedarburg to WIS 60 northwest of Cedarburg. Nothing significant had changed to the routing until 1947. At that point, WIS 143 was extended northwest to US 45/WIS 55 (now CTH-P) in the middle of Jackson and West Bend, superseding CTH-N in the process. By 1987, WIS 143 extended westward along present-day CTH-P and CTH-PV after US 45 was rerouted westward onto a bypass.

Prior to 1997, the Ozaukee County section of the highway was turned over to the county and Cedarburg (replaced by CTH-NN outside of Cedarburg), leaving the section in Washington County.  The rest of the road was turned over to local control in 1997, and is now designated as multiple county highways.

Major intersections

See also

References

External links

143
Transportation in Washington County, Wisconsin
Transportation in Ozaukee County, Wisconsin